John Stavros Mellekas (June 14, 1933 – June 2, 2015) was an American football offensive lineman in the National Football League.

Mellekas played 4 years of football and basketball at Rogers High School in Newport and was named as an inaugural inductee into the Rogers High School hall of fame in January 2008 and then played college football at the University of Arizona. He was a 4th round selection (47th overall pick) in the 1956 NFL Draft by the Chicago Bears. He played for the Bears (1956–1961), the San Francisco 49ers (1962), and the Philadelphia Eagles (1963).

Following his career, he was employed by the Newport school department as a physical education teacher for 36 years, retiring in 1996. Mellekas died in his hometown of Newport, Rhode Island on June 2, 2015. He was a Greek Orthodox Christian.

References

1933 births
2015 deaths
Sportspeople from Newport, Rhode Island
American football centers
American football offensive tackles
Arizona Wildcats football players
Chicago Bears players
San Francisco 49ers players
Philadelphia Eagles players